Brian Merritt Moehler (born December 31, 1971) is a former starting pitcher.

Moehler pitched for the University of North Carolina at Greensboro. He was selected by the Detroit Tigers in the sixth round of the 1993 draft, and assigned to the Niagara Falls Rapids. After the 1993 season, Moehler moved on to the Jacksonville Suns, where he pitched until late 1996, when he was called up by the Tigers.

Moehler made his major league debut in 1996, pitching in 2 games for the Tigers. In 1997, Moehler went 11–12 in 31 starts, the following year he would have his best season of his career, going 14–13 with a 3.90 ERA and 4 complete games, including 3 shutouts. In 1999, he led the American league in losses with 16. In 1999, during his stint with Detroit, he was caught scuffing the baseball against the Tampa Bay Devil Rays, and was suspended for 10 games. He would rebound in the year 2000, going 12–9 for Detroit. 2001 and 2002 Moehler pitched just a combined 4 starts due to injury, he would later be traded in 2002 to the Cincinnati Reds. He was the starting pitcher for the Tigers' inaugural game at Comerica Park in 2000. During his stint with the Tigers, he won both the last game at the old Tiger Stadium and the first game at the new Comerica Park.  

In 2003, Moehler signed with the Houston Astros but pitched in just 3 games. After taking the 2004 season off, Moehler came back in 2005 pitching for the Florida Marlins. He went 13–23 in two seasons with the Marlins, bouncing between the bullpen and the rotation.

On January 19, 2007, Moehler signed a one-year contract with the Houston Astros; at the end of spring training he earned a relief spot on the roster. On August 2, 2007, Moehler achieved his first save in a Major League game against the Atlanta Braves.

On November 4, 2012, Moehler was hired as a Georgia area scout for the Boston Red Sox.

References

External links

1971 births
Living people
Baseball players from North Carolina
Boston Red Sox scouts
Cincinnati Reds players
Detroit Tigers players
Corpus Christi Hooks players
Greenville Braves players
Gulf Coast Marlins players
Houston Astros players
Florida Marlins players
Jacksonville Suns players
Lakeland Tigers players
Major League Baseball pitchers
New Orleans Zephyrs players
Niagara Falls Rapids players
Round Rock Express players
Toledo Mud Hens players
UNC Greensboro Spartans baseball players
West Michigan Whitecaps players